These 372 species belong to Exoprosopa, a genus of bee flies in the family Bombyliidae.

Exoprosopa species

 Exoprosopa aberrans Paramonov, 1928 c g
 Exoprosopa abjecta Nurse, 1922 c g
 Exoprosopa abrogata Nurse, 1922 c g
 Exoprosopa acrospila Bezzi, 1923 c g
 Exoprosopa actites Painter, 1969 i c g
 Exoprosopa affinissima Senior-White, 1924 c g
 Exoprosopa agassizii Loew, 1869 i c g b
 Exoprosopa ahtamara Dils & Hikmet, 2007 c g
 Exoprosopa albata Bezzi, 1924 c g
 Exoprosopa albicollaris Painter, 1962 i c g
 Exoprosopa albida (Walker, 1852) c g
 Exoprosopa albifrons Curran, 1930 i c g b
 Exoprosopa albofimbriata Bezzi, 1924 c g
 Exoprosopa aldabrae Greathead, 1976 c g
 Exoprosopa alexon (Walker, 1849) c g
 Exoprosopa allothyris Bezzi, 1920 c g
 Exoprosopa altaica Paramonov, 1925 c g
 Exoprosopa ammophila Paramonov, 1931 c g
 Exoprosopa amseli Oldroyd, 1961 c g
 Exoprosopa ancilla Bezzi, 1924 c g
 Exoprosopa andamanica Pal, 1991 c g
 Exoprosopa angusta Bezzi, 1924 c g
 Exoprosopa annandalei Brunetti, 1909 c g
 Exoprosopa anomala Painter, 1934 i c g b
 Exoprosopa anthracoidea Jaennicke, 1867 c g
 Exoprosopa antica (Walker, 1852) c g
 Exoprosopa aphelosticta Hesse, 1956 c g
 Exoprosopa apiformis Hesse, 1956 c g
 Exoprosopa arcuata Macquart, 1847 c g
 Exoprosopa arenicola Johnson and Johnson, 1959 i c g
 Exoprosopa argentifasciata Macquart, 1846 i c g b
 Exoprosopa argentifrons Macquart, 1855 c g
 Exoprosopa argyrophora Bezzi, 1912 c g
 Exoprosopa asiatica Zaitzev, 1972 c g
 Exoprosopa asiris Greathead, 1980 c g
 Exoprosopa atrata Hesse, 1956 c g
 Exoprosopa atrinasis Speiser, 1910 c g
 Exoprosopa atripes Cole, 1923 i c g
 Exoprosopa atrisquama Hesse, 1956 c g
 Exoprosopa aureola Francois, 1967 c g
 Exoprosopa auriplena (Walker, 1852) c g
 Exoprosopa aurivestrix Francois, 1962 c g
 Exoprosopa aurulans Bezzi, 1924 c g
 Exoprosopa aztec Painter, 1969 i c g
 Exoprosopa baccha Loew, 1869 c g
 Exoprosopa balioptera Loew, 1860 c g
 Exoprosopa bangalorensis Zaitzev, 1987 c g
 Exoprosopa barnardi Hesse, 1956 c g
 Exoprosopa basifascia (Walker, 1849) c g
 Exoprosopa basifiascia (Walker, 1849) c g
 Exoprosopa batrachoides Bezzi, 1912 c g
 Exoprosopa bellula Painter, 1969 i c g
 Exoprosopa belutschistanica Lindner, 1979 c g
 Exoprosopa bengalensis Macquart, 1840 c g
 Exoprosopa bifurca Loew, 1869 i c g b
 Exoprosopa biguttata (Macquart, 1834) c g
 Exoprosopa bolbocera Hesse, 1956 c g
 Exoprosopa bowdeni Sanchez-Terron, 1989 c g
 Exoprosopa brachipleuralis Hesse, 1956 c g
 Exoprosopa brachycera Bezzi, 1924 c g
 Exoprosopa brahma Schiner, 1868 c g
 Exoprosopa brevinasis Bezzi, 1924 c g
 Exoprosopa brevirostris Williston, 1901 i c g b
 Exoprosopa brevistylata Williston, 1901 i c g
 Exoprosopa brunettii Zaitzev, 1987 c g
 Exoprosopa bucharensis Paramonov, 1929 c g
 Exoprosopa bulteri Johnson & Johnson, 1958 c g
 Exoprosopa busiris Jaennicke, 1867 c g
 Exoprosopa butleri Johnson & Johnson, 1959 i c g b
 Exoprosopa caffra (Wiedemann, 1821) c g
 Exoprosopa californiae (Walker, 1852) i c g
 Exoprosopa caliptera (Say, 1823) i c b
 Exoprosopa callima Painter, 1969 i c g
 Exoprosopa capnoptera Bezzi, 1912 c g
 Exoprosopa capucina (Fabricius, 1781) c g
 Exoprosopa castilla Painter, 1930 c g
 Exoprosopa celer Cole, 1916 i c g
 Exoprosopa cervina Bezzi, 1921 c g
 Exoprosopa chan Paramonov, 1928 c g
 Exoprosopa chionea Bezzi, 1924 c g
 Exoprosopa circeoides Paramonov, 1928 c g
 Exoprosopa claripennis Hesse, 1956 c g
 Exoprosopa clarki Curran, 1930 i c g b
 Exoprosopa clausina Bezzi, 1924 c g
 Exoprosopa cleomene Egger, 1859 c g
 Exoprosopa collaris (Wiedemann, 1828) c g
 Exoprosopa conochila Bezzi, 1924 c g
 Exoprosopa contorta Bezzi, 1924 c g
 Exoprosopa convexa (Walker, 1857) c g
 Exoprosopa costalis Macquart, 1846 c g
 Exoprosopa cracens Painter, 1969 i c g
 Exoprosopa cubana Loew, 1869 i c g
 Exoprosopa curvicornis Bezzi, 1924 c g
 Exoprosopa damarensis Hesse, 1956 c g
 Exoprosopa decastroi Hesse, 1950 c g
 Exoprosopa decipiens Bezzi, 1924 c g
 Exoprosopa decolor Bezzi, 1924 c g
 Exoprosopa decora Loew, 1869 i c g b
 Exoprosopa decrepita (Wiedemann, 1828) c g
 Exoprosopa dedecor Loew, 1871 c g
 Exoprosopa dedecoroides Paramonov, 1928 c g
 Exoprosopa delicata Greathead, 1967 c g
 Exoprosopa dichotoma (Schiner, 1868) c
 Exoprosopa didesma Hesse, 1956 c g
 Exoprosopa diluta Bezzi, 1924 c g
 Exoprosopa dimidiata Macquart, 1846 c g
 Exoprosopa discriminata Bezzi, 1912 c g
 Exoprosopa disrupta Walker, 1871 c g
 Exoprosopa divisa (Coquillett, 1887) i c g b
 Exoprosopa dodrans Osten Sacken, 1877 i c g b
 Exoprosopa dodrina Curran, 1930 i c g b
 Exoprosopa dorcadion Osten Sacken, 1877 i c g b
 Exoprosopa doris Osten Sacken, 1877 i c g b
 Exoprosopa dulcis Austen, 1936 c g
 Exoprosopa dux (Wiedemann, 1828) c g
 Exoprosopa eclipis Bezzi, 1924 c g
 Exoprosopa efflatounbeyi Paramonov, 1928 c g
 Exoprosopa efflatouni Bezzi, 1925 c g
 Exoprosopa elongata Ricardo, 1901 c g
 Exoprosopa eluta Loew, 1860 c g
 Exoprosopa empidiformis Lindner, 1979 c g
 Exoprosopa enigma Greathead & Evenhuis, 2001 c g
 Exoprosopa eremita Osten Sacken, 1877 i c g b
 Exoprosopa eritreae Greathead, 1967 c g
 Exoprosopa erronea Bezzi, 1924 c g
 Exoprosopa exigua Macquart, 1855 c g
 Exoprosopa extensa (Wulp, 1888) c g
 Exoprosopa fasciata Macquart, 1840 i c g b
 Exoprosopa fasciolata Painter, 1969 i c g
 Exoprosopa fascipennis (Say, 1824) i c g b
 Exoprosopa fastidiosa Bezzi, 1921 c g
 Exoprosopa filia Osten Sacken, 1886 i c g
 Exoprosopa fissicornis Bezzi, 1924 c g
 Exoprosopa flammea Brunetti, 1909 c g
 Exoprosopa flammicoma Francois, 1964 c g
 Exoprosopa flavicans Bezzi, 1924 c g
 Exoprosopa flavinervis (Macquart, 1846) c
 Exoprosopa flexuosus Pal, 1991 c g
 Exoprosopa formosula Bezzi, 1921 c g
 Exoprosopa fuligosa Painter, 1969 i c g
 Exoprosopa fulviops Szilady, 1942 c g
 Exoprosopa fumosa Cresson, 1919 i c g b
 Exoprosopa fuscescens Bezzi, 1924 c g
 Exoprosopa fuscula Bezzi, 1924 c g
 Exoprosopa gazophylax (Loew, 1869) c g
 Exoprosopa gentilis Bezzi, 1924 c g
 Exoprosopa ghilarovi Zaitzev, 1988 c g
 Exoprosopa glossops Greathead, 2001 c g
 Exoprosopa goliath Bezzi, 1924 c g
 Exoprosopa gracilis Greathead, 2006 c g
 Exoprosopa grandis (Wiedemann in Meigen, 1820) c g
 Exoprosopa griqua Hesse, 1956 c g
 Exoprosopa grisecens Bezzi, 1924 c g
 Exoprosopa grisescens Bezzi, 1924 g
 Exoprosopa guerini (Macquart, 1846) c g
 Exoprosopa gujaratica Nurse, 1922 c g
 Exoprosopa heros (Wiedemann, 1819) c g
 Exoprosopa heterocera Bezzi, 1912 c g
 Exoprosopa hulli Painter, 1930 i c g
 Exoprosopa hyalinipennis Cole, 1923 c g
 Exoprosopa hyalipennis Cole, 1923 i c g
 Exoprosopa hyalodisca Bezzi, 1923 c g
 Exoprosopa hyaloptera Hesse, 1956 c g
 Exoprosopa hypargyra Bezzi, 1921 c g
 Exoprosopa hypargyroides Hesse, 1956 c g
 Exoprosopa hypomelaena Bezzi, 1912 c g
 Exoprosopa ignifera (Walker, 1849) c
 Exoprosopa inaequalipes Loew, 1852 c g
 Exoprosopa indecisa (Walker, 1849) c g
 Exoprosopa infumata Bezzi, 1921 c g
 Exoprosopa ingens Cresson, 1919 i c g b
 Exoprosopa inornata Loew, 1860 c g
 Exoprosopa insignifera Evenhuis & Greathead, 1999 c g
 Exoprosopa insulata (Walker, 1852) c g
 Exoprosopa interrupta (Wiedemann, 1828) c
 Exoprosopa iota Osten Sacken, 1886 i c g b
 Exoprosopa italica (Rossi, 1794) c g
 Exoprosopa jacchus (Fabricius, 1805) c g
 Exoprosopa jonesi Cresson, 1919 i c g b
 Exoprosopa jubatipes Hesse, 1956 c g
 Exoprosopa junta Curran, 1930 i c g
 Exoprosopa khuzistanica Lindner, 1979 c g
 Exoprosopa lankiensis Zaitzev, 1988 c g
 Exoprosopa latifrons Bezzi, 1924 c g
 Exoprosopa latissima Bezzi, 1924 c g
 Exoprosopa leon Painter, 1969 i c g
 Exoprosopa lepida Painter, 1969 i c g
 Exoprosopa leucopepla Bowden, 1964 c g
 Exoprosopa linearis Bezzi, 1924 c g
 Exoprosopa litoralis Hesse, 1956 c g
 Exoprosopa litorrhynchoides Francois, 1962 c g
 Exoprosopa louisae Francois, 1962 c g
 Exoprosopa lucidifrons Becker & Stein, 1913 c g
 Exoprosopa luctifera Bezzi, 1912 c g
 Exoprosopa lugens Paramonov, 1928 c g
 Exoprosopa lunulata Bowden, 1964 c g
 Exoprosopa luteicincta Hesse, 1956 c g
 Exoprosopa luteicosta Bezzi, 1921 c g
 Exoprosopa luteocera Hesse, 1956 c g
 Exoprosopa lutzi Curran, 1930 i c g
 Exoprosopa mackieae Paramonov, 1955 c g
 Exoprosopa madagascariensis Macquart, 1850 c g
 Exoprosopa maenas Loew, 1869 c g
 Exoprosopa magnipennis Bezzi, 1924 c g
 Exoprosopa major Ricardo, 1901 c g
 Exoprosopa majuscula Hesse, 1956 c g
 Exoprosopa mara (Walker, 1849) c g
 Exoprosopa marleyi Hesse, 1956 c g
 Exoprosopa masienensis Hesse, 1950 c g
 Exoprosopa megaera (Wiedemann in Meigen, 1820) c g
 Exoprosopa meigenii (Wiedemann, 1828) i c g b
 Exoprosopa melaena Loew, 1874 c g
 Exoprosopa melanaspis Bezzi, 1924 c g
 Exoprosopa melanozona Hesse, 1956 c g
 Exoprosopa melanthia Hesse, 1956 c g
 Exoprosopa metapleuralis Hesse, 1956 c g
 Exoprosopa metopargyra Hesse, 1956 c g
 Exoprosopa mimetica Hesse, 1956 c g
 Exoprosopa minoana Paramonov, 1928 c g
 Exoprosopa minoides Paramonov, 1928 c g
 Exoprosopa minois Loew, 1869 c g
 Exoprosopa minos (Meigen, 1804) c g
 Exoprosopa minuscula Painter, 1969 i c g
 Exoprosopa mira Hesse, 1936 c g
 Exoprosopa mongolica Paramonov, 1928 c g
 Exoprosopa monticola Hesse, 1956 c g
 Exoprosopa morosa Loew, 1860 c g
 Exoprosopa mozambica Hesse, 1956 c g
 Exoprosopa mudigerensis Zaitzev, 1987 c g
 Exoprosopa munda Loew, 1869 c g
 Exoprosopa mus Curran, 1930 i c g
 Exoprosopa nebulosa Hesse, 1956 c g
 Exoprosopa nemesis (Fabricius, 1805) c g
 Exoprosopa nigrifera Walker, 1871 c g
 Exoprosopa nigrifimbriata Hesse, 1956 c g
 Exoprosopa nigrina Bezzi, 1924 c g
 Exoprosopa nigrispina Bezzi, 1924 c g
 Exoprosopa nigrita (Fabricius, 1775) c g
 Exoprosopa nigritella Bezzi, 1924 c g
 Exoprosopa nigroventris Painter, 1969 c g
 Exoprosopa niveiventris Brunetti, 1909 c g
 Exoprosopa noctula (Wiedemann, 1830) i c g
 Exoprosopa nonna Becker & Stein, 1913 c g
 Exoprosopa nova Ricardo, 1910 c g
 Exoprosopa novaeformis Bezzi, 1924 c g
 Exoprosopa nubifera Loew, 1869 c g
 Exoprosopa nuragasana Hesse, 1956 c g
 Exoprosopa obscurinotata Hesse, 1956 c g
 Exoprosopa obtusa Bezzi, 1924 c g
 Exoprosopa ogilviei Hesse, 1956 c g
 Exoprosopa onusta (Walker, 1852) c g
 Exoprosopa orientalis Bezzi, 1924 c g
 Exoprosopa ovamboana Hesse, 1956 c g
 Exoprosopa painterorum Johnson & Johnson, 1960 i c g b
 Exoprosopa pallasii (Wiedemann, 1818) c g
 Exoprosopa pallida Bezzi, 1924 c g
 Exoprosopa pallidifacies Hesse, 1956 c g
 Exoprosopa pallidipes Hesse, 1956 c g
 Exoprosopa pallidisetigera Austen, 1937 c g
 Exoprosopa palustris Bezzi, 1924 c g
 Exoprosopa panamensis Curran, 1930 c g
 Exoprosopa pandora (Fabricius, 1805) c g
 Exoprosopa paramonovi Evenhuis, 1978 c g
 Exoprosopa parda Osten Sacken, 1886 c g b
 Exoprosopa pardus Osten Sacken, 1886 i c
 Exoprosopa paucispina Hesse, 1956 c g
 Exoprosopa pauper Walker, 1871 c g
 Exoprosopa pavida Williston, 1901 i c g
 Exoprosopa pectoralis Loew, 1862 c g
 Exoprosopa pelurga Bowden, 1964 c g
 Exoprosopa pennata Nurse, 1922 c g
 Exoprosopa penthoptera Bezzi, 1912 c g
 Exoprosopa perpulchra Bezzi, 1921 c g
 Exoprosopa pharaonis Paramonov, 1928 c g
 Exoprosopa pictillipennis Austen, 1936 c g
 Exoprosopa pilatei (Macquart, 1846) c
 Exoprosopa pleroxantha Hesse, 1936 c g
 Exoprosopa pleskei Paramonov, 1928 c g
 Exoprosopa porricella Hesse, 1956 c g
 Exoprosopa portshinskiji Paramonov, 1928 c g
 Exoprosopa povolnyi Zaitzev, 1977 c g
 Exoprosopa praefica Loew, 1860 c g
 Exoprosopa procne Osten Sacken, 1886 c g
 Exoprosopa prometheus (Macquart, 1855) c
 Exoprosopa protuberans Bezzi, 1924 c g
 Exoprosopa pterosticha Hesse, 1936 c g
 Exoprosopa pueblensis Jaennicke, 1867 i c g b
 Exoprosopa puerula Brunetti, 1920 c g
 Exoprosopa pulcherrima Paramonov, 1928 c g
 Exoprosopa pullata Zaitzev, 1976 c g
 Exoprosopa punctifrons Bezzi, 1924 c g
 Exoprosopa punctulata Macquart, 1840 c g
 Exoprosopa punjabensis Nurse, 1922 c g
 Exoprosopa pusilla Macquart, 1840 c g
 Exoprosopa rectifascia Bezzi, 1924 c g
 Exoprosopa referta Bezzi, 1924 c g
 Exoprosopa restricta Bezzi, 1924 c g
 Exoprosopa retracta Bezzi, 1924 c g
 Exoprosopa retrorsa Brunetti, 1909 c g
 Exoprosopa rhea Osten Sacken, 1886 i c g b
 Exoprosopa rhodesiensis Hesse, 1956 c g
 Exoprosopa richteri Lindner, 1979 c g
 Exoprosopa robertii Macquart, 1840 c g
 Exoprosopa rostrifera Jaennicke, 1867 i c g b
 Exoprosopa rubescens Bezzi, 1924 c g
 Exoprosopa rufa Painter, 1962 i c g
 Exoprosopa rufina Bezzi, 1924 c g
 Exoprosopa rutila (Pallas & Wiedemann, 1818) c g
 Exoprosopa rutiloides Bezzi, 1924 c g
 Exoprosopa sackeni Williston, 1901 i c g
 Exoprosopa sanctipauli Macquart, 1840 c g
 Exoprosopa scaligera Bezzi, 1912 c g
 Exoprosopa schmidti Karsch, 1888 c g
 Exoprosopa scutellata Bhalla, 1991 c g
 Exoprosopa selenops Greathead, 2001 c g
 Exoprosopa senegalensis Macquart, 1840 c g
 Exoprosopa serva Bezzi, 1924 c g
 Exoprosopa sharonae Johnson and Johnson, 1959 i c g
 Exoprosopa sigmoidea Bezzi, 1912 c g
 Exoprosopa sima Osten Sacken, 1877 i c g
 Exoprosopa simillima Hesse, 1956 c g
 Exoprosopa simpsoni Bowden, 1964 c g
 Exoprosopa siva Nurse, 1922 c g
 Exoprosopa socia Osten Sacken, 1886 i c g
 Exoprosopa sola Painter, 1939 c g
 Exoprosopa sordida Loew, 1869 i c g
 Exoprosopa spadix Painter, 1933 c g
 Exoprosopa spectrum Speiser, 1910 c g
 Exoprosopa stackelbergi Zaitzev, 1972 c g
 Exoprosopa stannusi Bezzi, 1912 c g
 Exoprosopa stenomelaena Bezzi, 1924 c g
 Exoprosopa stevensoni Hesse, 1956 c g
 Exoprosopa strenua Loew, 1860 c g
 Exoprosopa stylata Brunetti, 1920 c g
 Exoprosopa subfascia (Walker, 1849) c g
 Exoprosopa tabanoides Bezzi, 1924 c g
 Exoprosopa tamerlan Portschinsky, 1887 c g
 Exoprosopa tarikerensis Zaitzev, 1987 c g
 Exoprosopa temnocera Bezzi, 1924 c g
 Exoprosopa texana Curran, 1930 i c g
 Exoprosopa thomae Fabricius, 1805 c g
 Exoprosopa thoracica Bezzi, 1924 c g
 Exoprosopa tiburonensis Cole, 1923 i c g
 Exoprosopa tihamae Greathead, 1980 c g
 Exoprosopa titubans Osten Sacken, 1877 i c g
 Exoprosopa transcaspica Evenhuis, 1978 c g
 Exoprosopa tricolor Macquart, 1840 c g
 Exoprosopa trigradata Hesse, 1956 c g
 Exoprosopa triloculina Hesse, 1956 c g
 Exoprosopa tripartita Hesse, 1956 c g
 Exoprosopa triplex Bezzi, 1924 c g
 Exoprosopa truquii Rondani, 1863 c g
 Exoprosopa tuckeri Bezzi, 1921 c g
 Exoprosopa turkestanica Paramonov, 1925 c g
 Exoprosopa tursonovi Zaitzev, 1988 c g
 Exoprosopa tursunovi Zaitzev, 1988 c g
 Exoprosopa unifasciata Ricardo, 1901 c g
 Exoprosopa uraguayi Macquart, 1840 c g
 Exoprosopa utahensis Johnson and Johnson, 1959 i c g
 Exoprosopa varicolor Macquart, 1846 c g
 Exoprosopa vassilijevi Paramonov, 1928 c g
 Exoprosopa vayssierei Seguy, 1934 c g
 Exoprosopa venosa (Wiedemann, 1819) c g
 Exoprosopa villaeformis Bezzi, 1912 c g
 Exoprosopa villosa Bezzi, 1924 c g
 Exoprosopa virgata Bowden, 1964 c g
 Exoprosopa vumbuensis Hesse, 1956 c g
 Exoprosopa xanthina Painter, 1934 i c g
 Exoprosopa zambesiana Hesse, 1956 c g
 Exoprosopa zanoni Bezzi, 1922 c g
 Exoprosopa zarudnyji Paramonov, 1928 c g
 Exoprosopa zimini Paramonov, 1929 c g

Data sources: i = ITIS, c = Catalogue of Life, g = GBIF, b = Bugguide.net

References

Exoprosopa